Jens Ola Johansson (born 2 November 1963 in Stockholm) is a Swedish keyboardist and pianist who currently plays in the Finnish power metal band Stratovarius and Ritchie Blackmore's rock project Rainbow. He is notable for his high-speed neoclassical and fusion style.

Biography
Johansson is son of Swedish jazz pianist Jan Johansson and brother of Ex-HammerFall drummer Anders Johansson. He is highly influenced by classic rock keyboardists like Don Airey, Eddie Jobson and Jon Lord. In 1982, the classically trained Johansson left the jazz fusion band Slem and joined the Swedish metal band Silver Mountain, which also included Anders. In 1983 he left Sweden for California and joined guitarist Yngwie Malmsteen as a member of his band, Rising Force. Numerous records and world tours ensued and he stayed with Yngwie until 1989. Johansson also played with the band Dio between 1989 and 1990. Like Anders, he began an ongoing collaboration with Jonas Hellborg in 1989 which has resulted in several progressive and avant-garde recordings, including Dissident, Unseen Rain (an acoustic piano trio record with Ginger Baker on drums) and the hard core progressive fusion record, E.

In 1993, Johansson co-founded a progressive blues metal project, The Johansson Brothers, and recorded a self-titled record. In 1996, with a different line-up, they recorded another album, Sonic Winter, this time under the name "Johansson", with Yngwie Malmsteen guesting on guitar. The last Johansson record, The Last Viking, a more "European metal" oriented album, was released in 1999 with special guests Michael Romeo and Göran Edman.

Johansson has released several instrumental solo records such as Fjäderlösa Tvåfotingar, Ten Seasons (a piano solo album improvised in the Mark Kostabi gallery, New York), Heavy Machinery (with Anders and Allan Holdsworth) and Fission (with Anders, Shawn Lane and Mike Stern) and many collaborations with other artists, metal compilations and Berends Brothers' band Mastermind.

He co-founded Heptagon Records to distribute his own recordings and that of other musicians, such as guitarist Benny Jansson and bassist Magnus Rosén. Johansson auditioned for Dream Theater after Kevin Moore left the band in 1994 but due to many delays by the band in making a decision he instead joined Finnish power metal band Stratovarius. Since 1995 he has remained in Stratovarius, and still releasing solo albums and appearing as a guest or session musician in other projects.

Johansson is a self-confessed computer nerd, admitting to have started on an Atari ST (which he still owns), and having coded software in C, as well as his own website in Perl. He rejects being considered one of the best keyboardists in the world, as he believes there are many people that are far better than him.

Gear

Johansson has used many types of keyboards and synthesizers throughout his career. Amongst his favourites are the Korg Polysix, Yamaha DX7 as a midi controller, (from the Rising Force times to present), the Oberheim Matrix Series and the Roland JV-1080 sound module. He is also fond of the Hammond Organ. Johansson is a computer fan and long-time Steinberg programs user (like Cubase). An example of his interest in computers is his record Fission, which is replete with special effects and sound experimentation.  His signature lead is emulation of Polysix on JV1080, going thru early Amp simulation / distortion pedal JD-10 by Morley.

Recently, he has been using PC-base system with Lenovo Laptop Computer both recording and live. And he uses JV1080 as backup on live.

Band membership
Timeline

Studio albums

References

External links
 Jens Johansson's Homepage
 Heptagon Records
 Stratovarius Homepage
 Interview with Jens Johansson, 1995

Further reading
Interview with JENS JOHANSSON (STRATOVARIUS) 

1963 births
Living people
Musicians from Stockholm
Swedish heavy metal keyboardists
Dio (band) members
Stratovarius members
Swedish atheists
Cain's Offering members
Rainbow (rock band) members
Yngwie J. Malmsteen's Rising Force members
Art Metal (band) members